Jan Kilmko (born 30 July 1960 in Prešov) was a Czechoslovakian nordic combined skier who competed in the late 1980s. He finished sixth in the 3 x 10 km team event at the 1988 Winter Olympics in Calgary.

References

External links
3 x 10 km Olympic results: 1988-2002 

Nordic combined skiers at the 1984 Winter Olympics
Nordic combined skiers at the 1988 Winter Olympics
Slovak male Nordic combined skiers
Living people
1960 births
Sportspeople from Prešov
Universiade medalists in nordic combined
Universiade gold medalists for Czechoslovakia
Competitors at the 1987 Winter Universiade